The Inter-American Foundation, or IAF, is an independent agency of the United States government that funds community-led development in Latin America and the Caribbean.  It was created through the Foreign Assistance Act of 1969 as an alternative to traditional foreign assistance that operates government-to-government on a much larger scale.  The IAF receives its funds through annual appropriations by Congress. Until 2019, the agency also received annual reflows from the Social Progress Trust Fund administered by the Inter-American Development Bank consisting of repayments on U.S. government loans extended under the Alliance for Progress to various Latin American and Caribbean governments. Since beginning operations in 1972, the IAF has awarded more than 5,600 grants worth more than $864 million.

Beginnings

With his articles in Foreign Affairs and his book The Engines of Change, Harvard professor George C. Lodge significantly influenced the intellectual climate that led to the passage of the IAF's enabling legislation. Most notably, Lodge wrote that poverty was the greatest threat to U.S. interests in the Americas. In “U.S. Aid to Latin America: Funding Radical Change,” which appeared in Foreign Affairs in July 1969., he urged creation of an “American Foundation [to] find and fund the engines of change which work directly to revolutionize Latin American social and political structures.” Lodge was appointed to the IAF's founding board of directors in 1971.

Representative Dante B. Fascell (D-Fla.) was the architect of the legislation to establish the Inter-American Social Development Institute (ISDI), which would later be renamed the Inter-American Foundation. The ISDI represented a redesigned form of foreign aid to channel development assistance directly to grassroots and civil society groups in developing countries. Congress designed the agency with a unique characteristic: gift authority, the ability to accept and channel contributions to its grantees: “[The IAF] may accept money, funds, property, and services of every kind by gift, device, bequest, grant, or otherwise, and make advances, grants, and loans to any individual, corporation, or other body of persons, whether within or without the United States of America, or to any government or governmental agency, domestic or foreign, when deemed advisable by the Foundation in furtherance of its purposes."

Congress enacted a bill with bipartisan support on December 30, 1969, that established ISDI as Part IV of the Foreign Assistance Act. On September 21, 1970, the Senate confirmed the candidates for the board of the agency: Augustin Hart, Jr., George C. Lodge, Charles A. Meyer, John Richardson, Jr., and John A. Hannah. Another two candidates were added on October 17, 1970: Governor Luís A. Ferré and Charles W. Robinson. The board's first act was to commission a study of development assistance headed by Irving Tragen to develop the agency's model. On March 16, 1971, William M. Dyal was sworn in as the agency's first Executive Director, and the agency officially began operating. The agency had received the $50 million designated in its initial authorization from other foreign assistance agencies by June 28, 1971.  

In his Second Annual Report to the Congress on United States Foreign Policy on February 25, 1971, President Nixon set forth the administration's vision of the agency as follows:  “The need is for innovative ideas and programs, particularly from non-governmental sources, which are more directly responsive to social problems as perceived by the people of the region. To meet this need, we created in 1970 the Inter-American Social Development Institute. Directed by a board with a majority from the private sector, the new Institute will provide funds primarily to non-governmental organizations in the U.S. and Latin America--such as universities, credit unions, and foundations--to help them share their expertise.”On August 3, 1971, the House Foreign Affairs Committee passed a legislative amendment changing the name of the agency from the Inter-American Social Development Institute to the Inter-American Foundation. In 1973, the IAF partnered with the Inter-American Development Bank to use up to $10 million annually in regional currencies from the U.S. government-funded Special Progress Trust Fund, an arrangement that was periodically renewed through 2019.  

The IAF has had a low profile because of its comparatively small budget.  However, during the mid-1980s, the IAF received some national attention when it became a political battleground for President Ronald Reagan and Congressional Democrats.

Mission statement
The IAF's enabling legislation can be found at 22 U.S. Code § 290f: "It shall be the purpose of the foundation, primarily in cooperation with private regional and international organizations, to

 strengthen the bonds of friendship and understanding among the peoples of this hemisphere;
 support self-help efforts designed to enlarge the opportunities for individual development;
 stimulate and assist effective and ever wider participation of the people in the development process;
 encourage the establishment and growth of democratic institutions, private and governmental, appropriate to the requirements of the individual sovereign nations of this hemisphere.” —Part IV, Section 401(b), Foreign Assistance Act of 1969

The guiding principle of the Inter-American Foundation is responsiveness to the ideas of organized people who are willing to invest and risk their own resources. Today, the agency defines its mission as follows: to identify, support, and partner with underserved people, their enterprises, and grassroots organizations to create thriving communities. According to the IAF's Strategic Plan for 2018–2022, its investments in communities in Latin America and the Caribbean serve U.S. interests by expanding economic opportunities, enhancing peace and security, strengthening democratic governance and combating corruption, and unlocking private, public, and community resources for grassroots development through partnerships.

Grant program

The IAF funds initiatives received in response to its call for proposals from grassroots groups and the organizations that support them in Latin America and the Caribbean. Projects are selected for funding on the basis of merit rather than by sector. Successful applicants receive between US$25,000 and US$400,000. The average length of grant is approximately three years. IAF grantees are required to contribute in cash or in kind resources toward the success of their projects and are encouraged to mobilize resources to continue their impact after their IAF funding has ended. The IAF does not accept proposals presented or directed by individuals, government entities; for-profit organizations; or organizations outside the country in which the project is located. The IAF also does not fund proposals for purely religious activities; research activities exclusively; only construction and equipment; charity or welfare projects of any kind; or projects associated with political parties or partisan movements.

The IAF looks for the following in a project it funds:

 Inclusivity: Projects should involve many community voices in developing, carrying out, and evaluating the project, including those who will benefit from the project; and engage partners in local government, the business community, and other civil society organizations.
 Use of community resources: Projects should include counterpart resources like money, land, supplies, infrastructure, labor, and office, storage, and meeting space; and identify a path to become sustainable after the IAF grant ends.
 Focus on results: Projects should impact the community in a positive and measurable way, show potential for strengthening all participating organizations, and enhance participants’ capacity to govern themselves.

Fellowship program

The IAF has periodically supported academic field research on grassroots development since 1974, providing fellowships to doctoral students, post-doctoral researchers, master's degree candidates and, between 1991 and 1995 a few outstanding Latin American and Caribbean grassroots leaders awarded the Dante B. Fascell Inter-American Fellowship to pursue independent study. The IAF is not currently funding fellowships.

Organizational structure

The Inter-American Foundation is governed by a bipartisan board of directors appointed by the president of the United States and confirmed by the U.S. Senate. Six members are drawn from the private sector and three from the federal government: employees of agencies of the United States concerned with inter-American affairs, the United States Executive Director of the Inter-American Development Bank, or the Alternate Executive Director of the Inter-American Development Bank. A president, appointed by the board, serves as the Inter-American Foundation's chief executive officer. The current President & CEO is Sara Aviel.  Previous presidents have included Paloma Adams-Allen (2017-2021), Robert Kaplan (2010-2017), Larry Palmer (2005–2010), David Valenzuela (2000–2005), George Evans (1994–1999), William Perrin (1990–1994), Deborah Szekely (1984 to 1990), Peter Bell (1980–1983), and William Dyal (1971–1980).

Publications

Detailed information on grassroots approaches to working with underserved communities can be found in the IAF's annual report and in its archived journal, Grassroots Development.

See also
 Title 22 of the Code of Federal Regulations

References

External links
 Inter-American Foundation official website
 Inter-American Foundation in the Federal Register
 Sourcewatch, Inter-American Foundation

International development agencies
Independent agencies of the United States government